Match officials for the 2019 Cricket World Cup were selected by the Umpire selection panel and the information was released on 26 April 2019. Umpire selection panel selected 16 umpires to officiate at the World Cup: Out of 16 umpires four were from Australia, five from England, four from Asia, one each from New Zealand, South Africa and West Indies. It also selected 6 match referees for the event.

Umpires
Out of the selected umpires, twelve of them belong to the Elite Panel of ICC Umpires while the remaining four belong to the International Panel of Umpires and Referees.
Ian Gould, an Elite panel umpire, announced that he would retire as an umpire following the conclusion of the tournament. On 6 July 2019, Gould retired from umpiring, after standing in the World Cup match between India and Sri Lanka.

Referees
Six referees were also selected by the selection panel. All the selected referees belong to the Elite Panel of ICC Referees.

References

officials
Cricket World Cup officials